"Home" is the first single from UK indie group Rooster from their second album Circles and Satellites. The song reached  33 on the UK Singles Chart.

Track listing
 "Home"
 "In Your Head"
 "In Your Head", is also included on the Japanese version of Circles and Satellites as a bonus track.

References

2006 singles
2006 songs
Rooster (band) songs
Songs written by Nick Atkinson